HTTU Stadium is a stadium in Ashgabat, Turkmenistan. It is used mostly for football matches and serves as the home for HTTU Aşgabat. It has a capacity of 1,000 people and located within the International Turkmen-Turkish University complex.

Football venues in Turkmenistan
Sports venues in Ashgabat